Greene County is a county located in the U.S. state of New York. As of the 2020 census, the population was 47,931. Its county seat is Catskill. The county's name is in honor of the American Revolutionary War general Nathanael Greene.

History

This transferred Prattsville, Vly Mountain, Halcott Center, Bushnellsville, Highmount, Shandaken, Lanesville, and Pine Hill within Greene County.

On April 15, 1814, the county borders were re-surveyed, and the line adjusted with no change in area.

On April 17, 1822, the border was again surveyed, with no change in area, but Palenville was found to be inside Greene County.

On April 23, 1823, the border was again resurveyed, and the Hudson River border with Columbia County realigned accordingly.

Geography
Greene County is located in southeast central New York State, just west of the Hudson River and south of Albany.

The northern and eastern regions are mostly low-lying flatlands. Along the Hudson River the lowest elevation is at sea level. The southern and western areas rise sharply into the Catskill Mountains.

Catskill Park takes up much of the south central region. The park contains some of the tallest peaks south of the Adirondacks. For example, the highest elevation is Hunter Mountain, at approximately 4,040 feet (1,232 m) above sea level;  In addition, there are many picturesque waterfalls in the park such as the famed, Kaaterskill Falls.

The entirety of Greene County is in the 19th Congressional District, and is represented by Republican Marc Molinaro.

Adjacent counties
 Albany County - north
 Rensselaer County - northeast
 Columbia County - east
 Ulster County - south
 Delaware County - west
 Schoharie County - northwest

National protected area
 Thomas Cole National Historic Site

Demographics

2020 Census

2000 census
As of the census of 2000, there were 48,195 people, 18,256 households, and 12,067 families residing in the county.  The population density was 74 people per square mile (29/km2).  There were 26,544 housing units at an average density of 41 per square mile (16/km2).  The racial makeup of the county was 90.76% White, 5.53% Black or African American, 0.28% Native American, 0.54% Asian, 0.02% Pacific Islander, 1.52% from other races, and 1.36% from two or more races.  4.31% of the population were Hispanic or Latino of any race. 18.8% were of Irish, 17.8% Italian, 17.5% German, 8.6% American and 6.9% English ancestry according to Census 2000. 92.3% spoke English, 2.8% Spanish, 1.5% German and 1.3% Italian as their first language.

There were 18,256 households, out of which 29.2% had children under the age of 18 living with them, 51.2% were married couples living together, 10.3% had a female householder with no husband present, and 33.9% were non-families. 27.9% of all households were made up of individuals, and 12.2% had someone living alone who was 65 years of age or older.  The average household size was 2.42 and the average family size was 2.97.

In the county, the population was spread out, with 23.00% under the age of 18, 9.5% from 18 to 24, 27.0% from 25 to 44, 24.8% from 45 to 64, and 15.7% who were 65 years of age or older.  The median age was 39 years. For every 100 females there were 106.5 males.  For every 100 females age 18 and over, there were 108.2 males.

The median income for a household in the county was $36,493, and the median income for a family was $43,854. Males had a median income of $35,598 versus $25,346 for females. The per capita income for the county was $18,931.  About 8.6% of families and 12.2% of the population were below the poverty line, including 15.7% of those under age 18 and 10.4% of those age 65 or over.

As of the 2010 census, the racial makeup of the county was 90.3% White, 5.7% African American, 0.3% Native American and 0.8% Asian. Hispanic or Latino people of any race were 4.9% of the population.

Politics

Greene County is considered a Republican stronghold. It was one of only eleven counties in New York that did not vote for Bill Clinton in 1996, a strong year for Democrats. It supported John McCain by a margin just under ten points in 2008 over Barack Obama, another Democratic year. In 2012, 54.1 percent of the county's voters chose Republican challenger Mitt Romney, and 43.7 percent chose Democratic incumbent Obama, despite it being again a Democratic year. In 2016, 59 percent of the county's voters chose Donald Trump while 34 percent chose Hillary Clinton. It has not supported a Democrat for president since 1964, and before that it previously did so in 1912.

In some elections, certain towns in Greene County have had a plurality that have voted Democratic, though the county remains very Republican.

Communities

Towns

 Ashland
 Athens
 Cairo
 Catskill
 Coxsackie
 Durham
 Greenville
 Halcott
 Hunter
 Jewett
 Lexington
 New Baltimore
 Prattsville
 Windham

Villages
 Athens
 Catskill (county seat)
 Coxsackie
 Hunter
 Tannersville

Census-designated places

 Cairo
 Cementon
 East Durham
 Greenville
 Haines Falls
 Jefferson Heights
 Leeds
 New Baltimore
 Palenville
 Prattsville
 Round Top
 Sleepy Hollow Lake
 South Cairo
 West Kill
 Windham

Hamlets

 Acra
 Cornwallville
 Climax
 Earlton
 Freehold
 Hannacroix
 Hensonville
 Lanesville
 Oak Hill
 Surprise
 Maplecrest

Notable people
 John Adams, (1778–1854), born in Oak Hill, United States Congressman
 Levi Hill, claimed early inventor of color photography
 Jeff "The Drunk" Curro Howard Stern Wack Packer
 Blossom Dearie, (1924-2009), jazz singer
 John B. Terry, (1796-1874), pioneer, merchant, soldier, and Wisconsin territorial legislature, born in Coxsackie
 Thurlow Weed, (1797-1882), born in Acra, NY. Newspaper publisher, politician, and party boss
 Edwin L. Drake, (1819-1880), invented method to drill oil from the ground, born in Greenville
 Scott Adams, born and raised in Windham, NY; an American cartoonist, creator of the Dilbert comic strip and the author of several nonfiction works of satire, commentary, business, and general speculation.

See also

 List of counties in New York
 National Register of Historic Places listings in Greene County, New York

References

Further reading

External links
 
 Greene County Government website
 Greene County Tourism website
 Greene County Historical Society
 Greene County History & Genealogy Website
 
 Early history of Greene County
 Hudson Valley Directory, listings pertaining to Greene County, New York

 
1800 establishments in New York (state)
Greene County, New York
Populated places established in 1800